Henry Stafford, 2nd Baron Stafford (before 1527 – 1 Jan 1565) was a British peer in the peerage of England and MP.

Family life
Henry Stafford was the eldest surviving son of Henry Stafford, 1st Baron Stafford and Ursula Pole. He married Elizabeth Davy, daughter of John Davy of Holbeach, Lincolnshire, before 1557.

Serving in Parliament
Henry Stafford failed twice in 1553 to be returned as knight for Staffordshire for Parliament. According to his father, he should have been returned as he was 'chosen by the whole shire, no man saying the contrary'. He was eventually elected in 1555, this time as a representative for Stafford. He did not appear to be active in the Commons, leaving little record of his actions; the History of Parliament notes that he was not on any list of those who opposed Government bills.

Honours and titles
Henry Stafford was knighted at Queen Mary I's coronation, 2 Oct 1553. He was appointed Justice of the Peace for Shropshire in 1554. He was appointed keeper of the records at the Tower of London early in Queen Elizabeth I's reign, a post he held until about January 1564. He complained to William Cecil at this point that he had been deprived of his office by William Bowyer.

Henry Stafford succeeded as the 2nd Baron Stafford at his father's death on 30 April 1563. He only held the barony for 3 years, being succeeded by his brother Edward Stafford on 8 April 1566.

Notes

References
 
 

2
Henry
Year of birth uncertain
1566 deaths
People of the Elizabethan era
English MPs 1555
Pole family
16th-century English nobility
Knights Bachelor